Chris Chugunov is a former American football quarterback for Ohio State. He played high school football at Montgomery High School in Skillman, New Jersey.

High school career
Playing at Montgomery High School, Chugunov committed to West Virginia in 2014. He finished high school career with 6,308 passing yards, 47 touchdowns and 16 interceptions with five games of 300 yards or more and was ranked the No. 27 player in New Jersey by ESPN.

Chugunov chose West Virginia over Western Michigan, Towson, Delaware and William & Mary.

College career
In 2015, Chugunov redshirted. As a redshirt freshman at West Virginia, Chugunov played in three games, completing only two passes. His debut game was against Missouri in 2016. The following year, he served as the primary backup behind Will Grier. He got the starting nod during two games during that season against Texas and Oklahoma.

Following the 2017 season, Chugunov decided to transfer to Ohio State, after he had graduated from WVU with a bachelor's in business.

References

External links
 Ohio State Buckeyes bio
 

1996 births
Living people
American football quarterbacks
Montgomery High School (New Jersey) alumni

Ohio State Buckeyes football players
West Virginia Mountaineers football players
People from Montgomery Township, New Jersey
Players of American football from New Jersey
Sportspeople from Somerset County, New Jersey